Vaagdevi College of Engineering (VCE) is an engineering college in Bollikunta, Warangal, Telangana, India.

History
VCE was established on 1998 by the Viswambhara Educational Society. It was conferred autonomous status in 2014.Vaagdevi group of colleges offer wide range of courses to all the eligible students.

Departments
 Computer Science and Engineering
 Electronics and Communication Engineering
 Electrical and Electronics Engineering
 Mechanical Engineering
 Civil Engineering
 Master of Business Administration
 Basic Sciences and Humanities

External links

Engineering colleges in Telangana
Education in Warangal
1998 establishments in Andhra Pradesh
Educational institutions established in 1998